Anolis rupinae, Haitian banded red-bellied anole, or Castillon anole, is a species of lizard in the family Dactyloidae. The species is found in Haiti.

References

Anoles
Reptiles described in 1974
Endemic fauna of Haiti
Reptiles of Haiti
Taxa named by Ernest Edward Williams